Louches is a commune in the Pas-de-Calais department in the Hauts-de-France region of France.

Geography
A village some 12 miles (19 km) southeast of Calais, on the D225 road.

Population

Places of interest
 The church of St.Omer, dating from the seventeenth century.

See also
Communes of the Pas-de-Calais department

References

Communes of Pas-de-Calais